The 2007 PBZ Zagreb Indoors was a tennis tournament played on indoor carpet courts. It was the 2nd edition of the PBZ Zagreb Indoors event and was part of the ATP International Series of the 2007 ATP Tour. It took place at the ITC Stella Maris in Croatia from January 29 through February 4, 2007.

Champions

Men's singles

 Marcos Baghdatis defeated  Ivan Ljubičić 7–6(7–4), 4–6, 6–4

Men's doubles

 Michael Kohlmann /  Christopher Kas defeated  František Čermák /  Jaroslav Levinský, 7–6(7–5), 4–6, [10–5]

External links
ATP Tournament Profile
Official website
Singles Draw
Doubles Draw
Qualifying Singles Draw

 
Zagreb Indoors
2007 in Croatian tennis